Raymond Austin Aloysius Yochim (July 19, 1922 – January 26, 2002) was an American professional baseball pitcher who appeared in four games over parts of two seasons in Major League Baseball for the St. Louis Cardinals—one game in 1948 and three during 1949.

Yochim had an extensive career in minor league baseball. He began in 1941 with the Springfield Cardinals, and moved his way up in the St. Louis organization over that year and 1942. He then missed three seasons, 1943 to 1945, while serving in the United States Marine Corps in the Pacific Theater of World War II. On April 19, 1945, The Sporting News erroneously reported that Yochim had died aboard a sunken transport ship during the Battle of Iwo Jima; however, Yochim was alive and stationed in Hawaii. The newspaper quickly printed a retraction when it learned that Yochim had disembarked from the ship earlier when he reported to his base in Hawaii before the vessel was deployed to the battle zone.

Yochim returned to baseball with the Triple-A Rochester Red Wings in –. Used exclusively in relief by Cardinals' manager Eddie Dyer, he did not earn a decision or a save, posting a 10.80 earned run average. He allowed three hits, four earned runs and seven bases on balls in 3 innings pitched, and was credited with four strikeouts and four games finished.

After his brief major league career, he continued to play in the minor leagues until , when he served as player-manager of the New Orleans Pelicans.

He was the older brother of former MLB pitcher and long time scout Lenny Yochim (1928–2013).

References

External links

1922 births
2002 deaths
American military personnel of World War II
Baseball players from New Orleans
Birmingham Barons players
Columbus Red Birds players
Fort Lauderdale Braves players
Fresno Cardinals players
Leesburg Lakers players
Little Rock Travelers players
Major League Baseball pitchers
Minor league baseball managers
New Iberia Cardinals players
New Orleans Pelicans (baseball) players
Panama City Fliers players
Rochester Red Wings players
St. Louis Cardinals players
Shreveport Sports players
Springfield Cardinals players
Texarkana Bears players
United States Marines